Fergus or Feargus is a common Scottish or Irish male given name derived from Scots Gaelic, meaning the strong (one) or the masculine (one).

As a surname, Ferguson or Fergusson is common across Scotland but particularly in Perthshire and Ayrshire. In Ireland, the Ferris family of County Kerry derives its surname from the patronymic .

Given name

Saints
 Saint Fergus

Nobles
 Fergus the Great (died c. 645), also known as Gwrgan Fawr or Gurgantius, a king of Ergyng, a Welsh kingdom of the early medieval period
 Fergus mac Echdach, Scottish king of Dál Riata from about 778 to 781
 Fergus of Galloway (died 1161), Lord of Galloway
 Fergus, Earl of Buchan (died before 1214)
 Fergus Morton, Baron Morton of Henryton, judge

Others
 Fergus Bowes-Lyon, brother of the Queen Mother
 Fergy Brown, Canadian politician 
 Fergus I. M. Craik (born 1935), Scottish cognitive psychologist
 Fergus Ewing (born 1957), Scottish politician
 Fergus Graham (1893-1978), 5th Baronet, British Member of Parliament
 Fergus Hume, novelist
 Fergus Johnston (born 1959), Irish composer
 Fergus Gordon Kerr (born 1931), Scottish Catholic priest, philosopher and theologian
 Fergus McAteer, Irish politician
 Fergus McMaster (1879-1950), Australian businessman and aviation pioneer
 Fergus Medwin (1874-1934), Australian politician
 Fergus Millar (1935–2019), British historian and Oxford professor
 Fergus Montgomery (1927-2013), British thrice Member of Parliament
 Fergus O'Brien, Irish politician
 Fergus O'Dowd, Irish politician
Fergus Ó hÍr, Irish activist, politician, head teacher and broadcaster
 Fergus Pyle (1935–1997), Irish journalist and editor
 Fergus Riordan, actor
 Fergus Smith (1843–1924), Australian politician
 Feargus Urquhart, Scottish-American video game designer
[Fergus Faulder] Scottish- English lord and strong man 
Also a womaniser

Fictional or mythological characters
 Fergus I (mythological king), said to be the "first king of Scotland"
 Fergus Dubdétach, legendary High King of Ireland of the 3rd century AD
 Fergus Fortamail, legendary High King of Ireland of the 4th century BC
 Fergus mac Léti, legendary king of Ulster
 Fergus mac Róich, in the Ulster Cycle of Irish mythology
 Fergus Mór, a king of Dál Riata in Scottish mythology
 Fergus Lethderg ("red-side" or "half-red"), a son of Nemed who leads his people against the Fomorians in the Irish Mythological Cycle
 Fergus, son of Eochaid Mugmedon, half-brother of Niall of the Nine Hostages (5th century)
 Sir Fergus, one of King Arthur's Knights of the Round Table in Le Morte d'Arthur
Fergus McDuck, Disney character
Fergus the Railway Traction Engine, character in Thomas the Tank Engine and Friends
 the title character of Fergus the Fish, British preschool animated series from the 1960s
 Fergus Cramer from the Nero Wolfe series
 Fergus Shannon, dog appearing in children's books by David Shannon
 Claudel "Fergus" Fraser, adoptive son of Claire and Jamie Fraser, and one of the supporting characters of Outlander, both in his series of novels and the television adaptation of the latter.
 Fergus the Hostler, a secondary character in the 1956 Robin Hood parody The Court Jester 
 Fergus Dargle, a character created by Bennigan's
 King Fergus, the leader of the foxes in the German film Der Sturmer
 King Fergus, father of Princess Mérida in the animated movie Brave
Fergus Roderick McLeod, Crowley King of Hell's real name when he was human in 1661-1723 before he was dragged down to hell, from the TV series Supernatural.
 Fergus Fuzz, Furchester leader from The Furchester Hotel
 Fergus Kearney, in the New Zealand soap opera Shortland Street
 Fergus, one of the titular main character's children from the DreamWorks animated film, Shrek Forever After
 Fergus Reid, character from the Wolfenstein game series

Surname

 Alex Fergus (1899–?), Scottish professional association footballer
 Dylan Fergus (b. 1980), American actor
 Sir Howard Fergus, Montserratian writer and historian
 James Fergus (1813–1902), miner, rancher, businessman and politician in Minnesota and Montana
 John Fergus (politician) (died 1865), British politician
 John Fergus (scholar) (c. 1700–c. 1761), Irish physician and man of letters
 Keith Fergus (b. 1954), American professional golfer
 Oris Fergus, Montserratian cricketer
 Thomas Fergus (1850–1914), New Zealand politician
 Tom Fergus (b. 1962), Canadian-raised American retired National Hockey League player

See also
List of Scottish Gaelic given names
List of Irish-language given names
Ferragus (disambiguation)

References

Irish families
Surnames of Irish origin
Irish masculine given names
Scottish masculine given names
Scottish surnames
Manx-language surnames